Nate Ness (born September 5, 1986) is an American football safety who is currently a free agent. He was signed by the Cleveland Browns as an undrafted free agent in 2009. He played college football at Arizona.

Ness has also been a member of the New York Jets, Seattle Seahawks, Miami Dolphins, Washington Redskins, St. Louis Rams, and Carolina Panthers.

References

External links
 Carolina Panthers bio 
 St. Louis Rams bio 
 Washington Redskins bio 
 Arizona Wildcats bio 

1986 births
Living people
Sportspeople from Los Angeles County, California
Players of American football from California
American football cornerbacks
American football safeties
Arizona Wildcats football players
Cleveland Browns players
New York Jets players
People from Gardena, California
Miami Dolphins players
Seattle Seahawks players
Washington Redskins players
St. Louis Rams players
Carolina Panthers players
Detroit Lions players
Gardena High School alumni